Mary Elizabeth Magill (born 1965) is an American legal scholar and academic administrator, currently serving as the 9th president of the University of Pennsylvania since July 2022. 

Magill previously served provost of the University of Virginia from 2019 to 2022 and dean of Stanford Law School from 2012 to 2019.

Early life and education 

A native of North Dakota, Magill is the daughter of Frank Magill, a senior United States federal judge on the United States Court of Appeals for the Eighth Circuit.  Her brother, Frank Magill Jr., is a District Judge in Minnesota's Fourth Judicial District. She earned a Bachelor of Arts degree in history from Yale University in 1988 and a Juris Doctor from the University of Virginia School of Law in 1995.

Professional career 

From 1988 until 1992, Magill worked as a senior legislative assistant for United States Senator Kent Conrad of North Dakota.

Magill worked as a law clerk for Judge J. Harvie Wilkinson III on the United States Court of Appeals for the Fourth Circuit from 1995 until 1996, and then worked as a clerk for United States Supreme Court Justice Ruth Bader Ginsburg from 1996 until 1997.  Magill joined the faculty of the University of Virginia School of Law in 1997, and she served as vice dean of the school from 2009 to 2012. In 2012, she was named dean of the law school at Stanford University, a position she held until 2019, when she returned to the University of Virginia to serve as the school's provost.

In January 2022, Magill was named as ninth president of the University of Pennsylvania. She became president on July 1, 2022.

See also 
 List of law clerks of the Supreme Court of the United States (Seat 6)

References 

1966 births
Living people
21st-century American women
American women academics
American women lawyers
Chief Administrators of the University of Pennsylvania
Deans of Stanford Law School
Law clerks of the Supreme Court of the United States
People from North Dakota
University of Virginia School of Law alumni
University of Virginia School of Law faculty
Women deans (academic)
Women heads of universities and colleges
American women legal scholars
Yale University alumni